Polataivao Fosi Schmidt (1933–2005) was Samoan politician and a member of the Legislative Assembly of Samoa from 1964-1999. He was a member of the Human Rights Protection Party.

Before his career in politics, Schmidt was the heavyweight boxing champion of Samoa, and scored over 80 knockouts victories in both amateur and professional boxing.

Boxing career

Fosi Schmidt (some sources list Fossi Schmidt) developed a keen interest in boxing from watching members of the United States military forces training in Australia during World War II. After compiling an undefeated amateur record of 30-0-0, 30 knockouts, Schmidt decided to become a professional boxer in 1952.

Schmidt ran up an impressive string of knockouts on the Samoan Islands and won the Samoan Heavyweight Boxing Championship. Schmidt said he trained on a diet of coconuts, coconut milk, and taro (similar to a potato) to give him his power.

On February 10, 1954, in Leififi on the Samoan Islands, Schmidt was sparring with local police constable Vaipou Ainu'u; an amateur heavyweight boxer. The two were training in a ring at the local police station when Schmidt knocked Ainu'u down. Ainu'u's head struck the ring floor and efforts to revive him failed. The 35-year-old Ainu'u died on the way to the hospital. Schmidt was greatly disturbed by Ainu'u's death, but realized it was a terrible accident, and he continued on with his career.

After going 47-0-0, 47 knockouts on the Samoan Islands, Schmidt traveled to Australia to continue his boxing training and career. After three consecutive knockouts in Australia, he became a headliner in the Australian newspapers.

Schmidt was dubbed the "Samoan Sensation" and appeared on the cover of the October 1954 issue of Australian Ring Digest. In October 1954, world lightheavyweight champion Archie Moore was touring Australia and a bout with Schmidt was purposed, but never happened.

The 1955 Ring Record Book credited Schmidt with scoring 50 consecutive knockouts, including knockouts over Tauso M'U KO 2 rounds, Fetuao KO 1 round, Lini KO 2 rounds, Loie KO 3 rounds, Viane KO 1 round, Enesi KO 2 rounds, Pili KO 2 rounds, Silipa KO 2 rounds, Filipo KO 2 rounds, Sefo KO 1 round and KO 2 rounds, Iefata KO 4 rounds.

Schmidt's undefeated knockout streak was ended when he lost to Fiji heavyweight Henry Bray by 5th round knockout (Source: 1955 Ring Record Book).

On 8 December 1954, Schmidt was knocked out in 3 rounds by Ross Jenkins. Schmidt continued to fight, but never again showed the promise of his earlier undefeated career.

Professional boxing record

Business and political career

In the early 1960s, Schmidt opened a number of successful trading stations. He also owned and ran the Apollo 11 nightclub in Saleufi.

In 1964, Schmidt entered politics and was elected to parliament, winning his election by a count of 41 votes to 36, in the electoral district of Gagaifomauga Number 3. He became known to his fellow Samoans as "King Pola". Schmidt was re-elected without opposition in three subsequent elections. Schmidt served in parliament from 1964-1999, but resigned due to bad health.

He was a Minister of Health, a Minister of Labour, and a Minister of Lands and Environment. Schmidt was a founding member of his country's Human Rights Protection Party.

Personal life

His mother was from Safune and his father from Safotu village on the island of Savai'i. Schmidt is the father of Samoan politician Laauli Leuatea Polataivao.

From 1999-2005, Schmidt underwent dialysis treatment in both New Zealand and Australia. He died on 19 December 2005, of heart failure. He was survived by his wife Ipu, and his son La'auli Leuatea Polataivao.

Sources

Australian Ring Digest, October 1954: SAMOAN SENSATION-FOSSIE SCHMIDT.
1955 Ring Record Book, 1955, page 74: Ring Deaths in 1954.
1955 Ring Record Book, 1955, page 833: Record: FOSSI(BROWNHAWK)SCHMIDT.
1955 Ring Record Book, 1955, page 733: Record: HENRY BRAY.
www.eventpolynesia.com
Pacific Magazine, March 1, 2006: People's Briefs: IN MEMORIAM.
Samoa Newsroom, April 2-April 8, 2006.

References

1933 births
2005 deaths
Members of the Legislative Assembly of Samoa
People from Gaga'ifomauga
Human Rights Protection Party politicians
Government ministers of Samoa
Samoan male boxers
Heavyweight boxers